Alice is a c.1918 oil on canvas painting by Amedeo Modigliani. It now hangs in the Danish National Gallery, to which it was donated in 1928.

Sources
Wayne, Kenneth. Modigliani and the artists of Montparnasse. — New York: Abrams, 2002. — С. 109.
Nørgaard Larsen, Peter. SMK highlights: Statens Museum for Kunst. — Kbh.: Statens Museum for Kunst, 2005. — .

1918 paintings
Portraits of women
Paintings in the collection of the National Gallery of Denmark
Paintings by Amedeo Modigliani
20th-century paintings in Denmark